The George Rogers Clark Monument was a historic monument consisting of multiple figures that was formerly located in Monument Square at Charlottesville, Virginia. Erected in November 1921, the monument consisted of seven figures, by the sculptor Robert Ingersoll Aitken, presented on the same pedestal. It was the last in a sequence of four works commissioned from members of the National Sculpture Society by philanthropist Paul Goodloe McIntire during the years 1919 to 1924. The sculpture was added to the National Register of Historic Places in 1997.

The monument measured approximately 24 feet in height, 20 feet in length, and 8 feet in width. It included a tall bronze figure of George Rogers Clark mounted on a stallion in the center. The pedestal bore the inscription: "/ ". 

The monument was removed by the University of Virginia on July 11, 2021. No immediate plan for what would be done with it was announced, although the university said it would consult with its students and members of the Native American community of Charlottesville when deciding what to do with it.

See also
Charlottesville historic monument controversy
Equestrian statue of Stonewall Jackson (Charlottesville, Virginia)
Meriwether and William Clark Lewis (sculpture)
Robert E. Lee Monument (Charlottesville, Virginia)
List of monuments and memorials removed during the George Floyd protests

References

External links
 

1921 establishments in Virginia
1921 sculptures
Bronze sculptures in Virginia
Buildings and structures in Charlottesville, Virginia
Equestrian statues in Virginia
Monuments and memorials on the National Register of Historic Places in Virginia
National Register of Historic Places in Charlottesville, Virginia
Outdoor sculptures in Charlottesville, Virginia
Sculptures of men in Virginia
Sculptures of Native Americans
Monuments and memorials removed during the George Floyd protests
Ships in art